was a social class that emerged in Japan during the early years of the Tokugawa period. In the social hierarchy, it was considered subordinate to the samurai warrior class.

Social Class 

The chōnin emerged in joka-machi or castle towns during the sixteenth century. The majority of chōnin were merchants, but some were craftsmen.   were not considered chōnin. Later, peasants, servants, and workers were also considered members of the social class.

While chōnin are not as well known to non-Japanese as other social classes in Japan, they played a key role in the development of Japanese cultural products such as ukiyo-e, rakugo, and handicrafts. Aesthetic ideals such as iki, tsū, and wabi-sabi were also developed among the chōnin. This association with cultural development emerged as a way for members of the class to break the strict social barriers that prevented individuals from ascending in the social hierarchy. Members of the chōnin  opted to develop culture within their communities, allowing members of such community to rise as "cultured individuals". This phenomenon is said to be behind the popularity of the iemoto system in the Edo period.

The socioeconomic ascendance of chōnin has certain similarities to the roughly contemporary rise of the bourgeoisie in the West. In the latter part of the Tokugawa period, the social class wielded the real power in the society although the warrior class still dominated the political sphere.

Origins 

By the late 17th century the prosperity and growth of Edo had begun to produce unforeseen changes in the Tokugawa social order. The chōnin, who were theoretically at the bottom of the Edo hierarchy (shinōkōshō, samurai-farmers-craftsmen-merchants, with chōnin encompassing the two latter groups), flourished socially and economically at the expense of the daimyōs and samurai, who were eager to trade rice (the principal source of domainal income) for cash and consumer goods.

References

External links 

Samurai, Chōnin and the Bakufu: Between Cultures of Frivolity and Frugality.
Britannica Article

Japanese culture
Japanese historical terms